Gold Jam Records is a Canadian record label established by DJ Gold Jam which operated from 2000 until 2017. It produced electronica, rock and francophone records. The last record to be produced by Gold Jam is the instrumental version of the album Cousteau's Dream.

Artists
Oliver Haze
Talisman
 TV content
 Music Documentary

Record labels established in 2000
Record labels disestablished in 2002
Defunct record labels of Canada